Jean Mitchell (born 17 December 1999) is an Australian representative sweep-oar rower. She is an Australian national champion, has represented at senior World Championships and won a gold medal at the 2022 World Rowing Cup.

Club and state rowing
Mitchell was raised in Victoria and attended Ruyton Girls' School where she took up rowing. Her senior club rowing has been from the Melbourne University Boat Club

She rowed in the Victorian women's eight to a Queen's Cup victory at the 2022 Interstate Regatta within the Australian Rowing Championships.

International representative rowing
In March 2022, Mitchell was selected in the Australian training squad to prepare for the 2022 international season and the 2022 World Rowing Championships. She rowed in the Australian women's eight at the World Rowing Cups II in Poznann to a bronze medal. At the 2022 World Rowing Championships at Racize, she was again in the Australian women's senior eight. They made the A final and finished in fifth place.

References

External links
Mitchell at World Rowing

1999 births
Living people
Australian female rowers
People educated at Ruyton Girls' School
21st-century Australian women